The Wytches are an English rock band formed in 2011 in Peterborough. Following their formation, the band were based in Brighton. The band consists of singer-songwriter Kristian Bell, bassist Daniel Rumsey and keyboardist/guitarist Mark Breed. Drummer Gianni Honey left the band in 2019.

History 
Kristian Bell and Gianni Honey had previously played together in the Crooked Canes in their hometown of Peterborough, whom the duo later dismissed as being "really adolescent and embarrassing". Honey was taught by former Morrissey drummer Spike T. Smith and played in local bands, Through Fire This Fall, the Joy Division influenced the Proles and metalcore band Khalo.

Following the split of the Crooked Canes, the duo moved to Brighton to attend university and advertised around campus for a bassist. Daniel Rumsey was the only person to respond and joined the band. Rumsey was a singer-songwriter originally from Dorset who had fronted the "horror punk" band Fall Victim before moving to Brighton where he fronted Dan Rumsey & the Bitter End and the Voyage Andromeda. Initially called the Witches, the band changed the spelling to Wytches to make their band name more easily found on Google. The band originally featured second guitarist Mark Breed, with whom Bell later started a side project with called the Mark and Kristian Band. The band released their debut single Beehive Queen in June 2013 via Hate Hate Hate Records and follow up single Robe For Juda in November 2013. In September 2013 the band released a low key limited edition cassette Thunder Lizard Revisited. The band released their debut US single Crying Clown (originally the b-side to the band's debut UK single) via Fat Possum Records in November 2013.

On 4 February 2014, the band announced they had signed with Heavenly Recordings and released Gravedweller as a free digital single. The band also signed to Partisan Records in the US.

The band released their debut album Annabel Dream Reader in August 2014. The album was recorded over two days at Toe Rag Studios in Hackney, London and co-produced by Bell and former Coral guitarist Bill Ryder-Jones. The album was recorded and mixed by Luke Oldfield on an 8-track Studer A80. It reached number 50 in the UK Albums Chart. 

In August 2016, Mark Breed re-joined the band as a permanent member. In September 2016 they released their second album All Your Happy Life. 

In 2018, the band parted ways with their UK record label Heavenly Recordings and US record label Partisan, leaving them unsigned. In March 2019, the band pulled out of a planned UK support tour with Drenge plus several warm up dates, citing "unforeseen circumstances". In October 2019, the band played 3 gigs as a 3-piece, with Gianni Honey replaced by Demelza Mather.

In May 2020 Daniel Rumsey released an EP called The Darkest Day from a new side project called Dan Rumsey & the Dark Days.

On 10 June 2020, the band released new single Cowboy via their own label Cable Code Records. The band confirmed that Gianni Honey had left the band, revealing that the band "were disheartened by the whole thing. All the work that goes into getting a band off its feet and into the public felt like something we’d have to try all over again". Session drummer Demelza Mather had toured with the band, but hasn't been announced as an official member of the band.

In November 2021 Kristian released a solo album Backfire through Cable Code Records

Band members
Current members
 Kristian Bell – lead vocals, guitar (2011–present)
 Daniel Rumsey – bass, backing vocals (2011–present)
 Mark Breed – keyboards, guitar (2011-2012, 2016–present)
Former members
 Gianni Honey – drums (2011–2019)

Discography
Studio albums

EPs
 The Witches (2012, self released)
 Thunder Lizard Revisited (2013, Hate Hate Hate)
 Gravedweller (2014, Heavenly)
 Thunder Lizard's Reprieve (2015, Scion Audio/Visual)
 Home Recordings (2016, self released)
 Double World (2017, self released)
Singles

References

English indie rock groups
Fat Possum Records artists
Musical quartets
Musical groups established in 2011
Heavenly Recordings artists
2011 establishments in England
Partisan Records artists
Dine Alone Records artists